Thoroughbred Racing on CBS is the de facto title for a series of horse races events whose broadcasts are produced by CBS Sports, the sports division of the CBS television network in the United States.

History

CBS first televised horse racing in 1948 with their broadcast of the Belmont Stakes. CBS would broadcast the Belmont Stakes the following year before losing the rights to NBC for the next three years. CBS would resume broadcasting the Belmont Stakes in 1953 and continue to televise it through 1985.

A year after their inaugural telecast of the Belmont Stakes, CBS broadcast the Preakness Stakes, which they would continue to do so through 1976. In 1977, ABC was awarded the contract to televise the Preakness.

Finally, CBS broadcast the Kentucky Derby from 1952 to 1974. The 1952 Kentucky Derby was the first to be broadcast on network television; Louisville had previously not been connected to network lines.

Notable moments
1973 Preakness Stakes – The time of the race was controversial. When the race ended, the official time for Secretariat was listed on the infield teletimer as 1:55. However, multiple clockers disagreed. The track's electronic timer had malfunctioned because of damage caused by members of the crowd crossing the track to reach the infield. The Pimlico Race Course clocker, E.T. McLean Jr., announced a hand time of 1:. However, two veteran Daily Racing Form clockers claimed the time was 1:, which would have broken the track record of 1:54 by Cañonero II in 1971. Tapes of Secretariat and Cañonero II were played side by side by CBS, and Secretariat got to the finish line first on tape, though this was not a reliable method of timing a horse race at the time. The Maryland Jockey Club, which managed the Pimlico racetrack and is responsible for maintaining Preakness records, reviewed the tapes of the 1973 race and the 1971 race, which held the record at the time, and found Secretariat had finished ahead of Cañonero II. However, the Jockey Club discarded both the electronic and Daily Racing Form times and recognized 1: as the official time,  slower than Cañonero's. But Daily Racing Form, for the first time in history, printed its own clocking of 1:53 next to the official time in the chart of the race. Then, on June 19, 2012, a special meeting of the Maryland Racing Commission was convened at Laurel Park at the request of Penny Chenery, Secretariat's owner, who hired companies to conduct a forensic review of the videotapes of the race, and Thomas Chuckas, the president of the Maryland Jockey Club. After over two hours of testimony, the commission unanimously voted to change the time of Secretariat's win from 1:54 to 1:53, establishing a new stakes record. The Daily Racing Form then announced that it would honor the commission's ruling with regard to the running time.
1973 Belmont Stakes – Secretariat became the ninth Triple Crown winner in history, and the first in 25 years since Citation. CBS Television announcer Chic Anderson described the horse's pace in a famous commentary: "Secretariat is widening now! He is moving like a !"
1978 Belmont Stakes – Affirmed over Alydar to become the last horse racing Triple Crown of the 20th century.

The end of CBS' involvement
In 1985, Triple Crown Productions was created when the owner of Spend a Buck chose not to run in the other two Triple Crown races because of a financial incentive offered to any Kentucky Derby winner who could win a set of competing races in New Jersey. The organizers of the three races realized that they needed to work together. Other than the Kentucky Derby, the Preakness Stakes and Belmont Stakes were considered the two "other" races. ABC Sports, which had broadcast the Derby since 1975, wanted to televise all the races as a three race package. CBS Sports, which showed the other two races, had much lower ratings for them, with the possible exceptions of years in which the Crown was at stake like 1973, 1977, and 1978.

Commentators

References

External links

CBS Sports
CBS original programming
CBS
1950s American television series
1960s American television series
1970s American television series
1948 American television series debuts
1985 American television series endings
CBS Sports Spectacular